Matthew O'Brien (1814–1855) was an Irish mathematician.

Life and work 
O'Brien was born at Ennis (county Clare) son of a medical doctor. In 1830 he was admitted in the Trinity College, Dublin, and in 1834 in the Caius College (university of Cambridge) where he graduated in 1838 as third wrangler, as pupil of William Hopkins. During a brief period (1840–1841) he was fellow of Caius College.

From 1844 to 1854 he was lecturer on Natural Philosophy and Mathematics at King's College London, he simultaneously held the post of lecturer on Astronomy in the Royal Military Academy, Woolwich.

O'Brien was the author of twenty mathematical papers and some elementary textbooks. His most notable contribution was in theory and application of the vector method, in a set of papers published between 1846 and 1852. However, he did not finish fully developing the method because some of his theories were unsatisfactory, and because he failed to include a treatment of associativity. His work was very innovative, but his ideas were almost completely ignored by his contemporaries.

References

Bibliography

External links 
 

1814 births
1855 deaths
Irish mathematicians
19th-century Irish mathematicians
Academics of King's College London
Alumni of Trinity College Dublin
People from Ennis